Patrick Durcan may refer to:

 Patrick Durcan (politician) (born 1951), Irish judge and politician
 Patrick Durcan (bishop) (1790–1875), Irish Roman Catholic clergyman

See also
 Paddy Durcan (born 1994), Gaelic footballer
 Patrick Durkin (1956–2020), American businessman and public official